Rigidoporus ulmarius is a fungal plant pathogen found mainly on broad-leaved trees. Elm is considered particularly susceptible.

The fruiting bodies are white, knobbly and relatively hard, requiring a fair amount of force to break. Older bodies may be covered with green algae, or partially covered with vegetation and leaves making them difficult to spot. They often encapsulate grass, twigs and other debris.

Tubes are 1–5 mm long in each layer, pinkish to orange when young, browning with age, each layer separated by a thin contrasting band of white flesh. Pores 5–8 per millimeter, red-orange fading to clay-pink or buff with age. Spores pale yellow, globose, 6–7.5 µm in diameter. Hyphal structure monomitic; generative hyphae lacking clamps. Habitat at the base of trunks of deciduous trees, usually elm. Season all year, perennial. Common. Not edible. Found in Europe.

However, in 2011, a specimen of Phellinus ellipsoideus (formerly Fomitiporia ellipsoidea) significantly larger was discovered in China.

See also
 Largest fungal fruit bodies

References

External links
 

Fungal tree pathogens and diseases
Meripilaceae
Fungi of Europe
Fungi described in 1952
Taxa named by James Sowerby